Metaparasitylenchus is a genus of nematodes belonging to the family Allantonematidae.

Species:

Metaparasitylenchus boopini 
Metaparasitylenchus cossoni 
Metaparasitylenchus cryptophagi 
Metaparasitylenchus helmidis 
Metaparasitylenchus mycetophagi 
Metaparasitylenchus oschei 
Metaparasitylenchus rhizophagi 
Metaparasitylenchus strangaliae 
Metaparasitylenchus telmatophili 
Metaparasitylenchus tetropii

References

Nematodes